Villafuerte de Esgueva is a municipality located in the province of Valladolid, Castile and León, Spain.

References

Municipalities in the Province of Valladolid